Nicolas Guibal (29 November 1725, Lunéville — 3 November 1784, Stuttgart) was a French court painter for the Duchy of Württemberg. His main works consist of ceiling paintings in Castle Solitude, Monrepos, and the Hohe Karlsschule.

References 
 
 
 Michael Semff, Wolfgang Uhlig: Nicolas Guibal. Exhibit catalog, Staatsgalerie Stuttgart 1989
 François Pupil and Simon Lee. "Guibal." In Grove Art Online. Oxford Art Online, (accessed December 30, 2011; subscription required).

External links 
 
 Brief biography on schlossgarten.de
 Entry for Nicolas Guibal on the Union List of Artist Names

French Baroque painters
1725 births
1784 deaths